Jacobus Ó Cethernaig, aka James O'Kearney was Bishop of Annaghdown during 1323–1324 and Bishop of Connor during 1324–1351.

Ó Cethernaig wa appointed to Annaghdown on 16 December 1323 but was translated from Connor between 7 and 15 May 1324. He received possession of the temporalities on 22 December 1324. He died 1351. He was a native of either County Galway or County Mayo.

See also
Catholic Church in Ireland

References

 A New History of Ireland: Volume IX - Maps, Genealogies, Lists, ed. T.W. Moody, F.X. Martin, F.J. Byrne, pp. 322–324.

External links
 http://www.ucc.ie/celt/published/T100005C/
 http://www.irishtimes.com/ancestor/surname/index.cfm?fuseaction=Go.&UserID=

Religious leaders from County Mayo 
People from County Galway
14th-century Roman Catholic bishops in Ireland
Bishops of Annaghdown